Mehmanabad (also Romanized as Mehmānābād; also known as Maimoon Abad and Meymūnābād) is a village in Rahmatabad Rural District, Zarqan District, Shiraz County, Fars Province, Iran. At the 2006 census, its population was 461, in 110 families.

References 

Populated places in Zarqan County